Street Dance of China (SDC; simplified Chinese: 这！就是街舞; traditional Chinese: 這！就是街舞; pinyin: Zhè! Jiùshì jiēwǔ) is a Chinese dance competition show produced by Youku, Tmall, and Master, and co-produced with Canxing. It was first broadcast on Youku's online platform on February 24, 2018. The format of the program is a street dance selection reality show, the hip-hop champions are selected through auditions, individual battles and group battles. The show brings public awareness to various hip-hop dances such as Locking, Popping, Breaking, Hip-Hop, House, Jazz, Urban, Waacking, Krump, etc.

Background 
In January 2018, Youku released the "This! This is" series of variety shows; in the Spring Festival in April of the same year, Youku upgraded it to "This! This is the youthful state", and built it into an online variety brand. "This! It's Street Dance", now famously known as Street Dance of China, was the first work of this series on Youku. Through the mode of "star mentor + professional dancer reality show", the program adopts individual selection and team combat performances. Under the leadership of four captains, four teams are formed to conduct group dance battles between teams, and finally the overall champion will be selected.With its high popularity and discussion, Street Dance of China was determined to become the first phenomenal hit in 2018.

Seasons

Program Stages

Stage 1: Audition 
Each of the four captains occupies a street, and dancers need to choose one of them to perform street dance. Only with the approval of the captain can they get a towel and successfully advance. There are a total of 100 promotion places (the promotion places may be slightly different in different seasons).

Stage 2: 100 to 49 
Dancers perform their own works in the order of drawing lots, and the captain will vote; if they get all the votes, they will be promoted directly; if they get 0 votes (the rules are slightly different in different seasons, some seasons are 0 votes Or 1 vote) they will be eliminated directly; the rest will enter the undetermined area, and the rest of the players can challenge. If no one refuses to accept the challenge, the dancer will advance directly; if anyone refuses to accept the challenge, the challenger needs to choose call out or battle (call out is an impromptu performance based on the performer’s music, and the battle is a one-on-one impromptu duel for two people; different Season rules are slightly different, some seasons may only have one of call out or battle); if multiple dancers refuse to accept the challenge, a challenger will be selected by spinning the bottle; the captain will still carry out the challenge if they refuse to accept the challenge Voting, the one with the most votes wins; if there is a tie, the penalty will be slightly different in different seasons, some seasons are an extra round of battle, some seasons are considered to be won by the challenger, and some seasons are considered to be the winner of the challenger; if If the challenger fails, he will lose the opportunity to show his personal performance and be eliminated directly. Different seasons have slightly different competition systems in this round. In some seasons, various dance styles may be divided into two groups for a duel to determine the work group and the challenge group.

Stage 3: The Group Dance Duel 
All dancers are divided into 8 groups, each group choreographs the dance according to the music drawn, and competes in pairs. After the 24-hour choreography, 8 groups of contestants will dance in pairs. The four team captains will judge the winners. All the winners will advance. After all the eight groups of competitions are over, all the undetermined players will start the tiebreaker; the order of appearances will be determined by turning the bottle, and a 1-on-1 dance will be performed within the specified time. The winner will be voted by the captain. The loser enters the end of the team and waits for the fight; the top three players in points within the specified time advance, and if someone beats all the players in a row or accumulates the specified points (usually the number of participants in the tiebreaker is reduced by one), they will advance directly.

Stage 4: The Teams Are Grouped 
A two-way selection method is adopted in the robbery battle. The room of four dancers is opened at a time, and each captain can chat with the four, but only one favorite player can be selected among the four. Hang the towel at the door of the room where the player is. After the selection of the four captains, the players will invert the selection. If the two sides choose each other, they will be paired to join the team. Otherwise, the players will enter the waiting area. There are cases where players are eliminated from being selected into the team in this stage).

Stage 5: The Semi-Finals 
The rules of the semi-finals are different in different seasons. The teams will compete in dance duels, one-on-one battles, etc., and the points system will be adopted.

Stage 6: Semi-Finals 
The semi-final is divided into two stages. The first stage is the fusion of dance styles, including national standard dance, modern and contemporary dance, classical dance, folk dance, etc. The winners will directly advance to the finals, and the losers will enter the second stage - the tiebreaker (the rules are slightly different in different seasons, and in some seasons, there are three groups competing in two groups), the tiebreaker The top three will enter the finals, and the rest of the dancers will be eliminated.

Stage 7: The Resurrection 
Some of the popular dancers eliminated in the semi-finals will compete in a tie-breaker.

Stage 8: The Finals 
The finals are divided into four parts: captain show, personal work competition, team dance, and final dissatisfaction. The order of appearance in the individual composition competition is generally determined by the results of the captain's show (the rules are slightly different in different seasons, and in some seasons, the captain's show does not score, and the order of appearance in the individual composition competition is determined by lottery); each dancer's individual In the work competition, more than ten other dancers are required to form a dance group to complete the work together; the top four in the individual work competition become the top four (the rules are slightly different in different seasons, and in some seasons, there are four groups after each group is divided into four groups. One becomes the top four), and enters the battle dance stage of the team; the team battle dance needs to be completed by the top four dancers and their dancers together, and the winner enters the final stage of disobedience. The ultimate disobedience part is a one-on-one dance, a total of 25 rounds, divided into five rounds to complete, and the number of rounds in each round is 7, 6, 5, 4, and 3 rounds; after each round, the host will ask the dancers about their clothes. If one side concedes defeat, the other side wins directly. If neither side concedes defeat, a vote is held, and the dancer who wins the first three rounds becomes the annual champion.

Production 
In order to bring hip-hop back to the streets, the program team specially built a real-life stage, which was integrated with the characteristic streets.

The creative stage art of the program team created the "Land of Freedom", a main stage that integrates future sci-fi style and oriental characteristic blocks. There are more than 100 cameras arranged in the four streets of the stage, almost every square meter has 1 camera.

Reception 
The first episode of "This! It's Street Dance" has 6.35 million views.

The Beijing News praised the shows captains for their strong dancing skills and the show itself for break the niche pop culture circle.

Guangming.com reviewed the show as using the sunny hip-hop culture to stimulate the positive energy of young people.

Huasheng Entertainment commended Street Dance of China for not only conveying the rich variety of dance styles and the concept of freedom and improvement to the audience, but also showing the real form of hip-hop, allowing hip-hop culture to enter the public's field of vision. "Not only can we see the spirit of the times that Chinese young people are full of confidence and dare to challenge, but also see the fusion of traditional Chinese cultural elements and street dance, releasing the creative charm of Chinese dancers".

NetEase Entertainment quoted the show as making hip-hop culture collide with Chinese culture on the stage. "The addition of Chinese songs gives hip-hop a refreshing feeling, and makes the familiar melody of the past show a new side. The creative fusion of classic songs and hip-hop not only shortens the distance between hip-hop and the audience, showing its variability and innovation, but also brings new vitality to classic old songs, broadening the creative ideas of pop music to a certain extent, and providing Chinese music. offers a wider range of possibilities.

Awards and nominations

International versions

Controversies 
Originally scheduled to appear in Street Dance of China, the star captain Jackson Wang, jumped to the same type of variety show "Hot-Blood Street Dance Troupe", which caused dissatisfaction with the producer Youku, while the artist Jackson responded that "it is purely a normal business choice."

The program team first apologized for misspelling Yi Yang Qianxi's name on the signboard. After the second episode aired, the show made a public apology for Huang Zitao's misleading editing. After the program was released one after another, Han Geng (Gengxin Studio) asked the producer to apologize to the Devil Editing, and Luo Zhixiang also posted a Weibo protest against the program group, maliciously reversing the sequence of the films, and deliberately creating confrontation among fans.

References

Chinese web series
2018 web series debuts
Dance competition television shows
Street dance competitions
Youku original programming
2018 Chinese television series debuts
Chinese-language television shows